Zachary Paul McIlwain (born June 6, 1986) is a National Veteran Advocate, Congressional Advisor, and veteran of the United States Army and the Iraq War.  McIlwain has made multiple appearances on national television and other national media sources as an advocate trying to raise awareness on the issues currently facing veterans.  He currently works with Iraq and Afghanistan Veterans of America, Members of Congress, and other Veteran and Military Service Organizations focused on military and veteran affairs.

Life and work 
McIlwain attended Delta High School in Muncie, Indiana.  Following graduation in 2004, McIlwain attended Ball State University before enlisting in the United States Army in 2005.

As an Infantryman, McIlwain was deployed to Iraq with the 172nd Stryker Brigade Combat Team (SBCT) in 2005-2006.  McIlwain was awarded the Army Commendation Medal with Valor Device as well as the Combat Infantry Badge.  McIlwain's unit's focus during that deployment was "quelling Sectarian violence in Baghdad through diplomacy, direct action, and target acquisition missions." McIlwain was deployed again to Iraq with Deuce Four in 2008-2009.  McIlwain left Active Duty to pursue his education, and finished his service in 2013 as an Infantry Platoon Sergeant holding the rank of Staff Sergeant.

According to McIlwain, when he left the military, he nearly became a "casualty of the war on veteran suicide."  He credits his wife, Kristin, and Iraq and Afghanistan Veterans of America with his life-changing transformation.  Upon seeking and receiving help, he went on to become a strong advocate for veterans in the national arena.  He also completed his Bachelor of Science in Economics at Ball State University with Cum Laude Honors.  McIlwain continues to utilize his own stories and struggles as a way to reach and touch the lives of veterans.

Through his work with Iraq and Afghanistan Veterans of America, he has been featured on national television, news media, and news print focused on bringing awareness to issues currently facing veterans.  McIlwain has been featured on CNN, Military Times, Comedy Central, and MSNBC.  McIlwain is currently a Leadership Fellow and Spokesperson for Iraq and Afghanistan Veterans of America, a Sitting Member of the Indiana Military Coalition, a Congressional Advisor on military and veteran affairs, a Financial Institution Specialist for the Federal Deposit Insurance Corporation, and sits on various Nonprofit Boards to include an animal rescue partnered with Pets for Patriots.

Personal life 
McIlwain was born in Muncie, Indiana and raised in Albany, Indiana. He married his wife, Kristin, in the fall of 2012.  He currently has no children.

Education 
2004 Delta High School, Muncie, IN
2012 Bachelor of Science degree, Economics, Ball State University, Muncie, IN

References

External links 
IAVA's Storm the Hill 2014 - http://stormthehill.org/stormers
Vet's Visit Capitol Hill, Army Times - https://archive.today/20140613165543/http://www.armytimes.com/article/20130322/BENEFITS04/303220014/Vets-visit-Capitol-Hill-demand-better-benefits#selection-2007.0-2007.40
The Lead with Jake Tapper - http://thelead.blogs.cnn.com/2013/03/20/hundreds-of-thousands-of-injured-veterans-wait-more-than-a-year-for-care/
Suicide on the Rise, News & Tribune - http://www.newsandtribune.com/x1667057549/Suicide-on-the-rise-among-veterans
Returning Veterans Face Huge Backlog, PBS Newshour - https://www.pbs.org/newshour/bb/military-jan-june13-vabenefits_03-29/
How can Government Battle a "Suicide Epidemic" Among Veterans, National Journal - http://www.nationaljournal.com/defense/how-can-government-battle-a-suicide-epidemic-among-veterans-20140403
In Veteran's Long Wait, McClatchy DC - http://www.mcclatchydc.com/2013/06/06/193233/in-veterans-long-wait-for-benefits.html
The Obscenity of Suicide, Providence Journal - http://www.providencejournal.com/writers/bob-kerr/20140404-bob-kerr-the-obscenity-of-suicide-that-haunts-our-veterans.ece

1986 births
Living people
United States Army personnel of the Iraq War
Ball State University alumni
People from Muncie, Indiana
People from Albany, Indiana
Indiana Republicans
United States Army soldiers